Sushun may refer to:

Emperor Sushun (died 592), emperor of Japan during the Asuka period
Sushun (Qing dynasty) (1816–1861), politician and regent during the Chinese Qing dynasty

See also
Şüşün, also known as Shushun, a village and municipality in the Kurdamir Rayon of Azerbaijan